Charles Meynier (1763 or 1768, Paris – 1832, Paris) was a French painter of historical subjects in the late 18th and early 19th century. He was a contemporary of Antoine-Jean Gros and Jacques-Louis David.

Biography 

Meynier was the son of a tailor. Already at a young age he was trained by Pierre-Philippe Choffard. As a student of François-André Vincent, Meynier won the second prize in the 1789 prix de Rome competition; Girodet won. He became a member of the Académie de France à Rome. In 1793 he went back to Paris.

He made designs for the bas-reliefs and statues on the Arc de Triomphe du Carrousel and the Paris Bourse. From 1816 onward, he was a member of the Académie des Beaux-Arts. In 1819 Meynier was appointed teacher at the École des Beaux-Arts. Like his wife he died of cholera.

Works 

 "Milo of Croton", 1795 Oil on Canvas Montreal Museum of Fine Arts Montreal, Quebec
 Nine canvases of the Muses, commissioned by François Boyer-Fonfrède, but after his bankruptcy they were purchased by General Nicolas Antoine Xavier Castella de Berlens and transferred to his château de Wallenried in Jura, Switzerland, where they remained for roughly 180 years. They were subsequently transferred to the Cleveland Museum of Art, where conservator Dean Yoder dedicated five years to cleaning and in-painting the damaged works. They are currently on public display in Cleveland.
Apollo, God of Light, Eloquence, Poetry and the Fine Arts with Urania, Muse of Astronomy, 1798, Cleveland Museum of Art, Cleveland, Ohio
 Calliope, Muse of Epic Poetry, 1798, Cleveland Museum of Art, Cleveland, Ohio
 Clio, Muse of History, 1800, Cleveland Museum of Art, Cleveland, Ohio
 Erato, Muse of Lyrical Poetry, 1800, Cleveland Museum of Art, Cleveland, Ohio
 Polyhymnia, Muse of Eloquence, 1800, Cleveland Museum of Art, Cleveland, Ohio
 Napoleon in Berlin, 1810, Palace of Versailles
 Wisdom Defending Youth from the Arrows of Love, 1810, National Gallery of Canada

Notes and references

External links 
Exhibition of Meynier's work on La Tribune de l'art

1768 births
1832 deaths
18th-century French painters
French male painters
19th-century French painters
Members of the Académie des beaux-arts
19th-century French male artists
18th-century French male artists